Lucheng is a District in Changzhi, in  south-eastern Shanxi province of the People's Republic of China. As a division of Changzhi City, it covers an area of 615 km² and has a population of 210,000. Lucheng's economy is driven by coal industry and limestone mining.

A village in Lucheng county, Zhangzhuangcun (张庄村, pinyin: Zhāngzhuāngcūn), sometimes translated as Long Bow Village, was made famous by the book Fanshen written by William H. Hinton. The book chronicles the changes Zhangzhuangcun underwent after the defeat of occupying Japanese forces by the communist Eighth Route Army and the ensuing land reform movement by the Chinese Communist Party during second Chinese civil war. Hinton documented his return to Zhangzhuangcun years later in Shenfan, chronicling what had happened in the years since and describing how the Cultural Revolution affected the village.

History
In 1994, its title changed from Lucheng County to Lucheng City (a county-level city under the administration of Changzhi) with approval by the State Council.
In 2018, its title changed to Lucheng District.

Climate

Transportation 
China National Highway 207

References

External links
Official website, in Chinese
Official statistics, in Chinese
Chinese Pig Under the Roof (Changzhi Revolution Story)

Cities in Shanxi
County-level divisions of Shanxi
Changzhi